The Alcazaba of Badajoz is an ancient Moorish citadel in Badajoz, Extremadura, western Spain. The alcazaba as it now appears was built by  the Almohads in the 12th century, although it probably existed from the 9th century, when Badajoz was founded. In the 11th and 12th centuries it was the residence of the rulers of the taifa of Badajoz.

It was declared a national monument of Spain in 1931.

History
Badajoz was founded by Abd-al Rahman Ibn Marwan in 875. After he had led several rebellions, he was expelled by Mérida but was given the chance to found a new city. Here, on a hill commanding the new city, he built a large citadel which granted Badajoz a strategic role in controlling the passage from Portugal to central Iberia.

The current line of walls date mostly from the Almohad age, although there are traces of earlier work from 913 and 1030; in 1169 the Almohad caliph Abu Yaqub Yusuf rebuilt the fortress, giving it its current appearance. The last Muslim restoration was carried on by Abu Yahya ibn Abi Sinan in the 13th century, few years before the capture of the city by the Christian King Alfonso IX of León.

During the Peninsular War (1805-1813) the citadel was successfully stormed by allied-British, Spanish & Portuguese forces under the command of the Duke of Wellington. As a result, the Napoleonic hold on Western Spain was significantly weakened, and the Storming of the Alcazaba became part of Wellington's growing reputation for success in battle.

Description
The citadel measures . It is bounded to the north by the Guadiana river and to the east by the Rivillas torrent. The less steep parts of the slopes and other strategically weak points are defended by towers. The whole line of walls features a parapet, while the barbican and the ditch which once added protection have disappeared.

In the towers area was the palace of the lords of Badajoz, featuring several baths and mosques. After the Christian conquest, the largest, the Great Mosque, was turned into a church, which acted as the cathedral of Badajoz until the construction of the current one. The Great Mosque had five naves separated by arches supported by columns, and external buttresses. For its construction elements of Roman and Visigoth edifices were used, such as capitals and columns. Another building of the Muslim palace which was converted after the Christian conquest was the Military Hospital, now home to the Library of Extremadura.

Another building in the Alzacaba is the Palace of the Dukes of Feria, built by the Grand Master of the Order of Santiago, Lorenzo Suárez de Figeroa (1387–1410). Built in Renaissance style with Mudéjar elements, it was restored in the 17th century. The façade features a central arch connecting two square towers with irregularly place windows; the palace has a  trapezoidal plan and a cloister. It is currently home to the Provincial Archaeological Museum.

It has an octagonal plan, and is surmounted by a small temple added in Mudéjar style in the 16th century.

Other towers include:
Torre de las Siete Ventanas
Torre de las Doncellas
Torre del Alpéndiz
Torre Abarlongada
Torre de la Horca or Torre de los Ahorcados
Torre de Santa María, the most visible remain of the ancient cathedral
Torre del Palacio Episcopal (Bishop's Palace Tower)

Gates include:
Puerta del Capitel, one of the two original Almohad gates which have been preserved
Puerta de Yelves o de Carros
Puerta del Alpéndiz, in the northern side of the citadel
Puerta de la Coraxa or Puerta de la Traición

The Alcazaba includes  also a large park.

See also
Taifa of Badajoz

External links

Page at Badajoz's municipal website 

Buildings and structures completed in the 12th century
Buildings and structures in Extremadura
Badajoz
Tourist attractions in Extremadura